Indium(III) telluride (In2Te3) is a chemical compound. It is an intermetallic compound, so it has properties intermediate from a metal alloy and a metal-nonmetal ionic crystal. As so, it has intermediate conductivity and is classified as a semiconductor.

It reacts with strong acids to produce toxic hydrogen telluride gas.

References

Tellurides
Indium compounds
Semiconductor materials